Brdo (Serbian Cyrillic: Брдо, meaning "hill") may refer to:

Serbia
Brdo (Nova Varoš), village near Nova Varoš
Banovo Brdo (Баново Брдо), an urban neighborhood of Belgrade
Labudovo Brdo (Лабудово брдо), an urban neighborhood of Belgrade
Julino Brdo (Јулино Брдо), an urban neighborhood of Belgrade
Pašino Brdo (Пашино Брдо), an urban neighborhood of Belgrade
Petlovo Brdo (Петлово Брдо or Певац) (also "Pevac"), an urban neighborhood of Belgrade
Topčidersko Brdo (Топчидерско Брдо), an urban neighborhood and former municipality of Belgrade
Kanarevo Brdo (Канарево Брдо), an urban neighborhood of Belgrade
Begovo Brdo (Бегово Брдо), a village in Kruševac, Rasina district
Vinča-Belo Brdo, an archaeological site in the village of Vinča near Belgrade
Zeleno Brdo (Зелено брдо), part of Mali Mokri Lug, an urban neighborhood of Belgrade
Glumčevo Brdo, part of Barajevo, a suburban neighborhood of Belgrade
A section of Braće Jerković (an urban neighborhood of Belgrade) called Mitrovo Brdo
Mramorsko Brdo, in Merošina
Simino Brdo, in Loznica
Bumbarevo Brdo, in Knić

Slovenia
Brdo, Domžale, a settlement in the Municipality of Domžale
Brdo, Ljubljana, a neighborhood of the City Municipality of Ljubljana
Brdo, Nazarje, a settlement in the Municipality of Nazarje
Brdo, Nova Gorica, a village in western Slovenia, in the Municipality of Nova Gorica
Brdo, Šentjur, a settlement in the Municipality of Šentjur
Brdo, Slovenske Konjice, a settlement in the Municipality of Slovenske Konjice
Brdo, Tržič, a settlement in the Municipality of Tržič
Brdo Castle near Kranj (Brdo pri Kranju), an estate and manor in the Municipality of Kranj, in the Upper Carniola region
Brdo pri Lukovici, a settlement in the Municipality of Lukovica

Bosnia and Herzegovina
Bivolje Brdo, village in the Čapljina municipality of Herzegovina
Brdo, Donji Vakuf, a village in Donji Vakuf municipality
Brdo (Pale), a village in Bosnia and Herzegovina
Dobro Brdo, a settlement in Bosnia and Herzegovina
Babića Brdo, a settlement in Bosnia and Herzegovina
Brdo, Vitez, a village in Vitez municipality

Other
Novo Brdo (Ново Брдо; Novobërda or Novobërdë, Artana or Artanë), a town and municipality in the Pristina district of Kosovo
Velje Brdo, a settlement in Podgorica, Montenegro
Oblo Brdo, a settlement in Montenegro
Golloborda, or Golo Brdo, a geographical area in southeastern Albania